The 1974 WCT World Doubles was a men's tennis tournament played on indoor carpet courts in Montreal, Canada that was part of the 1974 World Championship Tennis circuit. It was the tour finals for the doubles season of the WCT Tour. The tournament was held from May 2 through May 5, 1974.

Final

Doubles

 Bob Hewitt /  Frew McMillan defeated  Owen Davidson /  John Newcombe 6–2, 6–7(6–8), 6–1, 6–2

World Championship Tennis World Doubles
1974 World Championship Tennis circuit
1974 in Canadian tennis